Logan Miller (born ) is an American actor. He is known for starring in the Disney XD sitcom I'm in the Band (2009–2011) and for voicing Sam Alexander / Nova in the animated series Ultimate Spider-Man (2012–2017). In films, he has starred in A Dog's Purpose (2017), Love, Simon (2018), Escape Room (2019), and Escape Room: Tournament of Champions (2021).

Life and career
Miller was born in Englewood, Colorado, and was raised in New Mexico, Minnesota, and Dallas, Texas. In 2009, he began starring as Tripp Campbell in the Disney XD sitcom I'm in the Band. He also played teenage Connor Mead, the younger version of Matthew McConaughey's character, in the 2009 film Ghosts of Girlfriends Past.

Filmography

Film

Television

Video games

References

External links

Living people
1990s births
21st-century American male actors
American male child actors
American male film actors
American male television actors
American male voice actors
People from Englewood, Colorado
Year of birth uncertain